Pathum Ratchawongsa is a district (amphoe) in the eastern part of Amnat Charoen province, northeastern Thailand.

Geography
Neighboring districts are (from the south clockwise): Phana, Mueang Amnat Charoen, and Chanuman of Amnat Charoen Province; Khemarat, Kut Khaopun, and Trakan Phuet Phon of Ubon Ratchathani province.

History
The district was created on 2 July 1993, consisting of the three tambons, Kham Phon, Nong Kha, and Na Wa from Chanuman district, Lue and Huai from Phana district and Non Ngam from Mueang Amnat Charoen district.

Administration
The district is divided into seven sub-districts (tambons), which are further subdivided into 73 villages (mubans). Na Wa Yai is a sub-district municipality (thesaban tambon) which covers parts of tambons Na Wa and Na Pa Saeng. There are a further seven tambon administrative organizations (TAO).

References

External links
amphoe.com

Pathum Ratchawongsa